Dan Boyle (born 14 August 1962) is an Irish Green Party politician and author who served as Deputy leader of Seanad Éireann from 2007 to 2011. He was a Senator from 2007 to 2011, after being nominated by the Taoiseach. He served as a Teachta Dála (TD) for the Cork South-Central from 2002 to 2007.

He was elected to Cork City Council in May 2019.

Early life and education
Boyle was born in Chicago, Illinois, to emigrant Irish parents. He has lived in his mother's native city of Cork since he was eight years of age, in the Turners Cross area of the city. He was educated at local schools; Scoil Chríost Rí and Coláiste Chríost Rí, and at the Cork Institute of Technology, where he studied Business Studies and Child Care. He received an MBS in Government from University College Cork in 2015. He was married to Bláithín Hurley from 1987 to 2014, they have one daughter.

At the time of the 1992 general election, he had served as a board member of the Cork Youth Federation, the National Youth Federation, and as chairperson of the National Youth Clubs Council.

Political career
In 1991, he was elected to Cork City Council, the first Green Party candidate to do so. At the 2002 general election, he was elected to Dáil Éireann for the Cork South-Central constituency. He was the Green Party Spokesperson for Finance, Social and Family Affairs and Community, Rural Development and the Islands during the 29th Dáil. He was also the party whip. In 2002, he resigned his seat on Cork City Council, where he was replaced by Chris O'Leary.

At the 2007 general election, Boyle lost his seat in the Dáil. He was subsequently part of the Green Party team that negotiated a programme that brought the party into the Irish government for the first time in its history. He was nominated by Taoiseach Bertie Ahern to Seanad Éireann as a Senator on 3 August 2007. He was appointed as Deputy Leader of the Seanad on 16 August 2007. He succeeded John Gormley as Chair of the Green Party/Comhaontas Glas in 2007. He was succeeded in that office by Roderic O'Gorman in 2011.

He was an unsuccessful candidate for the Green Party in the 2009 European Parliament election for the South constituency.

Commenting on Willie O'Dea's defamation case on 17 February 2010, Boyle said that he has "no confidence" in O'Dea and declaring him to be "compromised". On 18 February 2010, O'Dea resigned as Minister for Defence.

He ran for Dáil Éireann in Cork South-Central constituency at the 2011 general election, but failed to get elected. He stood as a candidate in the 2011 Seanad election on the Industrial and Commercial Panel but was not elected. He was an unsuccessful Green Party candidate for Cork City Council at the 2014 local elections. In May 2019, Boyle was elected to Cork City Council for the Cork South Central local electoral area. In November 2019, he sought to have further drive-thru restaurants banned in Cork. The Southern Star reported in October 2020 that Boyle was a voluntary board member of CHA, an Approved Housing Body (2020). He has also served as a board member of the Firkin Crane, the Crawford Art Gallery, Corcadorca Theatre Company, Terence MacSwiney Community College and the Lavitt Gallery. He was made a  community representative on the Public Participation Network for Cork City Council. Boyle has served as Vice President of the National Youth Council of Ireland and Chair of NASC, the Irish Immigrant Support Agency.

As of 2021, Boyle served on the Board of the Irish Council of Social Housing.

Other work
In 2011, he released a music album titled Third Adolescence.

He has authored three books on political history - A Journey to Change (2006); Without Power of Glory (2012) and Making Up The Numbers (2017).

He was later hired by the Wales Green Party in 2015, as their campaign manager for the 2016 Welsh Assembly election. In 2015, he was credited by the Irish Examiner as being the driving force behind the Green Foundation think tank.

References

 

1962 births
Living people
Green Party (Ireland) TDs
Green Party (Ireland) senators
Local councillors in Cork (city)
Members of the 23rd Seanad
Members of the 29th Dáil
Politicians from Chicago
Politicians from County Cork
You're a Star contestants
People educated at Coláiste Chríost Rí
Nominated members of Seanad Éireann
Alumni of Cork Institute of Technology